Superhuman strength is a superpower commonly invoked in fiction and other literary works such as mythology. A fictionalized representation of the phenomenon of hysterical strength, it is the power to exert force and lift weights beyond what is physically possible for an ordinary human being. Alternate terms of superhuman strength have included enhanced strength, super-strength and increased strength. Superhuman strength is an amorphous ability, varying in potency depending on the writer or the context of the story in which it is depicted.

Characters and deities with superhuman strength have been found in multiple ancient mythological accounts and religions.

Superhuman strength is a common trope in fantasy and science fiction. This is generally by means of mechanisms such as cybernetic body parts, genetic modification, telekinetic fields in science fiction, or magical/supernatural sources within fantasy. A plethora of comic book superheroes and super-villains display some degree of super strength. Some films invoke a fictional substance or drug that gives the superpower. The level of superhuman strength portrayed can vary greatly, from just outside the "normal" or "natural" human range of the strongest strongmen, powerlifters and weightlifters (e.g. unarmored Master Chief, Captain America or Deathstroke), to nearly unlimited strength (e.g., Hulk, Juggernaut, Superman, Supergirl, Wonder Woman, Thor, Hercules or Goku).

Humans are actively trying to achieve superhuman strength via technology and scientific experimentation. Athletes have turned to various methods to improve performance, such as blood doping or taking anabolic steroids. Other technologies being researched are robotic exoskeletons to be worn by humans to enhance movement and strength.

History 
Superhuman strength is a common ability of many gods and demigods in ancient mythology, such as Hercules/Heracles (Roman/Greek), Beowulf (Anglo-Saxon), Samson (the Bible), Bhima (Hindu) and Achilles (Greek). Attempts to modify the human body in order to gain extraordinary strength is common throughout history, as seen in fiction through characters such as Terminator, Robocop, Iron Man and Cyborg.

Humans have tried to enhance their strength through the use of substances. Accordingly, “In Ancient Rome, gladiators would drink herbal infusions to strengthen them before chariot races.” Currently, drugs including stimulants, anabolic steroids, diuretics and β-blockers are ingested to enhance strength and other attributes.

Humans have tried to use external devices to enhance their strength. The earliest device that was patented for this specific purpose can be credited to Nicholas Yagn, who filed the patent in 1890. The device was described to be an “apparatus for facilitating walking, running, and jumping” through the use of bags of compressed air. The United States Department of Defense is considering a variety of technologies to create an exoskeleton intended for military use to enhance soldier performance.

Applications
In the real world, extraordinary strength can occur via science. A person can become stronger, tougher, and more physically powerful than would seem humanly possible when using enhancements such as doping, substances and training.

Records describe instances of people going beyond "normal" strength in specific circumstances without taking any specific measures, as in the case of Tom Boyle, who was able to lift the front of a car in order to rescue a person trapped beneath it. Penn State professor of kinesiology Vladimir Zatsiorsky stated that extraordinary strength can occur when a person engages their muscles through the conscious “exertion of will”. Zatsiorsky claims that trained athletes can improve their strength under specific conditions of competition. Fear can also cause a person to exhibit enhanced human strength. (see hysterical strength)

The term appears in weight-lifting and 'protein formula' commercials without proof of their efficacy.

Weight lifters and other athletes routinely perform feats that appear to be superhuman to others. At the same competition he squat-lifted .

In fiction 
Many fictional works involve superhuman strength, rooted in religious texts or in scientific form. The depiction of superhuman strength dates as far back as the earliest recorded work of writing, with the Sumarian hero Gilgamesh. Early legends portray characters gaining their superhuman strength from the gods and exhibiting characteristics of both heroic humans and gods.
 
More recently superhuman strength is employed by characters called superheroes in comic books, which dates back to the 1930s. Characters such as Mr. Incredible, The Incredible Hulk, Superman, and Wonder Woman possess the strength to perform physical feats impossible for the human body. These characters and their powers draw from earlier myths. Wonder Woman ostensibly descended from the Amazons, a group of women possessing superhuman strength. In many of these fictional works, the dilemma and solution lies in the character's superhuman abilities.  Having these powers alienates them from society but also aids them in their quest. Recurring adaptations of well-known characters are often employed, which continue to perpetuate the use of superhuman strength in fiction.

See also
Berserker
Furor Teutonicus
Myostatin
Physical strength
Hysterical strength

References 

Mythological powers
Strength
Science fiction themes
Muscular system